M73 or M-73 may refer to:

 M73 machine gun, an American belt-fed machine gun
 M-73 (Michigan highway), a state highway in Michigan
 M73 motorway, a motorway in Scotland
 BMW M73, a 1993 V12 piston engine
 Messier 73, a random grouping of stars in the constellation Aquarius